The former French Catholic diocese of Boulogne existed from 1567 to the French Revolution. It was created after the diocese of Thérouanne was suppressed because of war damage to the see; effectively this was a renaming. The Concordat of 1801 suppressed the diocese of Boulogne, transferring its territory to the diocese of Arras. The seat was the Boulogne Cathedral, demolished in 1793.

Bishops
 Claude-André Dormy 1567–1599
 Claude Dormy 1600–1626
 Victor Le Bouthillier 1626–1630
 Jean Dolce 1633–1643
 François Perrochel 1643–1675
 Nicolas Ladvocat-Billiard 1677–1681
 Claude Le Tonnelier de Breteuil 1682–1698
 Antoine-Girard de La Bournat 1698
 Pierre de Langle 1698–1724
 Jean-Marie Henriau 1724–1738
 Augustin-César D'Hervilly de Devise 1738–1742
 François-Joseph-Gaston de Partz de Pressy 1742–1789
 Jean-René Asseline 1789–1790

See also
 Catholic Church in France
 List of Catholic dioceses in France

Notes

Bibliography

Reference works
  (Use with caution; obsolete)
  (in Latin) 
 (in Latin)

Studies

Boulogne-sur-Mer
Boulogne
Religious organizations established in the 1560s
Boulogne
1567 establishments in France
Boulogne